Denny Marcin (April 24, 1942 – September 20, 2017) was an American football coach. He was the defensive line coach of the New York Giants from 1997 to 2003 and the New York Jets from 2004 to 2006.

He died on September 20, 2017, in Southport, North Carolina at age 75.

References

1942 births
2017 deaths
Miami RedHawks football coaches
North Carolina Tar Heels football coaches
Illinois Fighting Illini football coaches
New York Giants coaches
New York Jets coaches
Sportspeople from Cleveland
People from Southport, North Carolina